The Russian Embassy School in New Delhi is a Russian international school located in Chanakyapuri, New Delhi. It is run by the Russian Ministry of Foreign Affairs.

It was previously under the Ministry of Foreign Affairs of the Soviet Union. It was upgraded from a primary school to an eight-year school under Order No. 957 from the Soviet Ministry of Foreign Relations in 1974. This was effective on 11 September that year. The same ministry upgraded it to a secondary school under Order No. 4063 18 July 1991. It was further upgraded to a high school with an in-depth study of a foreign language from Order No. 1053 of the Russian Ministry of Foreign Affairs.

See also

 Embassy of India School Moscow
 India–Russia relations
 Education in India

References

External links
 Russian Embassy School in New Delhi 

International schools in Delhi
Delhi
India–Russia relations
India–Soviet Union relations
New Delhi